Cable News Network Portugal (known as CNN Portugal and abbreviated as CNN PT) is a Portuguese basic cable and satellite television news channel owned by Media Capital, launched on 26 February 2009 as TVI 24, the 24-hour news channel of the terrestrial network Televisão Independente. The network's name was changed to CNN Portugal on 22 November 2021. Media Capital has a licensing agreement with the American CNN Global, which is currently owned by Warner Bros. Discovery.

Its competitors include SIC Notícias, RTP3 and CMTV.

History

As TVI 24

TVI 24 was on TVI's drawing board for several years but plans for its official launch officially commenced in 2008. It was initially expected to launch on February 20, 2009, TVI's anniversary, but weeks before the launch, it was postponed to February 26 to focus on the celebration of TVI's sixteenth anniversary.  The network was assigned channel 7 on most pay television lineups.

In 2011, José Alberto Carvalho became director of the channel and also TVI's overall news director. TVI24 received a refresh on January 9, 2012, where it became more competitive with its direct competitors and affirmed itself as the largest multimedia news channel in Portugal.

With the change, all news blocks on the channel were rebranded as Notícias 24, except for programs like Discurso Direto, SOS24, 21ª Hora, 25ª Hora and 2ª Hora, where in addition to news updates there are discussion, interactivity and analysis components. Between 2015 and 2019, the 21ª Hora is the main program of the channel. Filling in this place currently is another generic Notícias 24 bulletin. On weekdays, after SOS24, the journalists Ana Sofia Cardoso, José Alberto Carvalho and Judite Sousa take turns presenting bulletins.

From 20 February 2017, the network's news programming was broadcast from a refreshed TVI news studio.

As CNN Portugal
On 24 May 2021, it was announced that Media Capital signed a memorandum of understanding for a licensing agreement with CNN and as a result, TVI 24 would be rebranded as CNN Portugal. The rebrand commenced on 22 November 2021 at 21:00 GMT.

Programming

 Novo Dia
 CNN Hoje
 CNN Meio Dia
 CNN Prime Time
 Agora CNN
 CNN Fim de Tarde
 CNN Desporto
 Jornal da CNN
 CNN Sábado
 CNN Domingo

Ratings

References 
In March 2022, CNN Portugal was the most-watched paid channel - and the 4th most watched channel, in general - in Portugal, with a share of 4.7%. CNN Portugal dethroned crime and sensacionalist news/generalist channel CMTV - which had been leading among paid channels for 62 months -, but CMTV got the lead again in the following month of April.

External links
 CNN Portugal – Official Website
 CNN Portugal online broadcast

Portugal
2021 establishments in Portugal
24-hour television news channels in Portugal
Televisão Independente
Television channels and stations established in 2009
Warner Bros. Discovery networks